Hilla Liyanage Don Piyadasa Gunsekera (born 1915 – died 5 April 1980 as ), popularly as Piyadasa Gunasekera, was an actor in Sri Lankan cinema. In a career spanning more than three decades, Gunasekera is considered the greatest villain ever to appear in Sinhala cinema after Dommie Jayawardena at the time.

Personal life
Cyril was born on 12 February 1926 in Maligakanda, Colombo, Sri Lanka. He was educated at Industrial College, Campbell Place and Ananda College, Colombo. After school life, he worked as a travel agent of Tram car driver for Trans International and enlisted in the Army during World War II.

His daughter Lankarajini is a talented singer who started her career in Sunen Gokula's 'Sangeetha Sandyawa' program in radio. She was educated at St. Paul's College, Milagiriya.

He died on 22 September 1992 at the age of 65. His death from alcohol poisoning was a controversial event.

Career
He started his acting career as a theater actor where he performed in the popular stage plays Rodi Kella and Samudra Devi produced by Sirisena Wimalaweera. Then in 1952, he made his maiden cinematic appearance with the drama religious film Siri Sangabo. The film is unique in Sinhala cinema history, as its story and dialogue were written by a Buddhist monk, Ven. Wathuregama Somalankara Thero. However, his most dramatic and critic acclaim performance came through the 1955 film Seda Sulang directed by T. Somasekaran. Also his role as 'Podi Ralahamy' in the film Handapana. Some of his other popular films include: Daru Duka, Sāraviṭa, Maha Rǣ Hamu Vū Sthriya, Lasanda, Romeō Julieṭ Kathāvak, Veeduru Geval, Baḍuth Ekka Horu, Binaramalī, and Sikuruliyā.

Apart from Sinhala films, he also starred in two English films Kommissar X – Drei gelbe Katzen (The Three Yellow Cats) and The Green Emeralds. As a technician, he worked for Arthur Rank and M.G.M. film productions such as Purple Plain, Elephant Walk, Star of Colombo, and Laughing Anne. After many villain roles, he made a white role in the film Senasuma Kothanada. In the film Haara Lakshaya, he played the role of James Seneviratne, the main antagonist. The film was based on the first horrific robbery and murder in Sri Lanka, known as the turf club robbery that occurred on 27 January 1949. After the success in the film, he received several villain roles again in the films: Hathara Wate, Vanaraja, Aparadaya Saha Danduwama, Kalyani Ganga, Jeevana Ganga and Tom Pachaya. In 1981, he played the role of 'Devadatta' in the film Ajasaththa, which became one of his other milestone.

In 1965 at the 2nd United Lanka Fans Society Award Ceremony, he won the award for Best Co Actor for his role in the film Suba Sarana Sapa Sithe. In 1968, he won the Special Awards at 5th Sarasaviya Awards for the film Daru Duka. Then in 1970 at 7th Sarasaviya Awards, Gunasekera won the Best Supporting Actor award for the critics acclaimed role in Binaramalee. Later in 1974, he won the Deepashika Special Award at 4th Deepashika Award Ceremony for his contribution to the Sinhala cinema.

In 2013, For the first time in the country, the Stamp Bureau has released four stamps of four villain actors including Piyadasa Gunasekera.

Filmography

References

External links
 

1915 births
1980 deaths
Sri Lankan male film actors
Sinhalese male actors
People from British Ceylon
People from Colombo
Alumni of Ananda College